Qiudong Wang is a professor at the Department of Mathematics, the University of Arizona. In 1982 he received a  B.S. at Nanjing University and in 1994 a Ph.D. at the University of Cincinnati.

Wang is best known for his 1991 paper The global solution of the n-body problem, in which he generalised Karl F. Sundman's results from 1912 to a system of more than three bodies. However, L. K. Babadzanjanz claims to have made the same generalization earlier, in 1979.

References 

Chinese emigrants to the United States
Nanjing University alumni
University of Cincinnati alumni
University of Arizona faculty
American astronomers
Living people
Year of birth missing (living people)